Harry Coleman McGehee Jr. (called Coleman; July 7, 1923 – March 14, 2013) was a bishop in the Episcopal Church in the United States of America. He served the Diocese of Michigan as bishop coadjutor from 1971 to 1973 and as diocesan bishop from 1973 to 1990. McGehee was also former deputy attorney general of the Commonwealth of Virginia.

Early life and ministry
McGehee was born in Richmond, Virginia in 1923. He served during World War II as a 2nd lieutenant in the U.S. Army Corps of Engineers. After completing his military service, he graduated from Virginia Tech in 1947. He then earned a law degree at the University of Richmond in 1949. During his time practicing law, he served as deputy attorney general of the Commonwealth of Virginia. McGehee later entered the Protestant Episcopal Theological Seminary of Virginia, graduating in 1957.

He was ordained deacon on June 7, 1957, and priest on June 22, 1958, both by Bishop Frederick D. Goodwin of Virginia. Prior to coming to Michigan, he was rector of Immanuel-on-the-Hill Episcopal Church in Alexandria, Virginia, from 1960 to 1971, where he was the pastor to President Gerald R. Ford and Betty Ford.

McGehee was elected bishop in May 1971, beginning his service in October of that year. Then 48, he succeeded the Richard S. M. Emrich, who had led the Michigan diocese since 1948.

In 1988, he approached the National Convention of the Episcopal Church in Detroit with a plan for an economic justice ministry. With their help, the Bishop H. Coleman McGehee Economic Justice Fund was established in 1988, and transitioned into the Opportunity Resource Fund in 2010.

Community activism
McGehee was known as a civil rights and peace advocate and activist within Michigan. He specifically developed a reputation for supporting women's rights, LGBT equality, and union labor. He offered a liturgy for peace on multiple Good Fridays at the gates of Williams International in Walled Lake, Michigan where missiles were then being made. His support of women serving as clergy culminated in 1977 when he ordained Meredith Hunt, the first woman to become a priest in the Diocese of Michigan. He also welcomed gay and lesbian members into the church and ordained some gay and lesbian people.

McGehee founded the Michigan Coalition for Human Rights in December 1980 with Thomas Gumbleton, Catholic former auxiliary bishop in Detroit, and rabbi Richard Hertz.

Retirement and death
McGehee retired on January 1, 1990, with a special election held in May 1988 to elect his successor. While a woman was a finalist for the position, which would have resulted in the first woman to become an Episcopalian bishop, ultimately the election was won by R. Stewart Wood Jr., rector of St. John's Episcopal Church in Memphis, Tennessee.

Five years into retirement, he supported the locked-out Detroit Free Press and Detroit News employees in 1995. At the age of 72, he stood with them on the picket line, spoke for them and also went to jail with them.

McGehee continued to engage on LGBT issues by serving as chair of the Triangle Foundation (later Equality Michigan) Board of Advisors - the long-serving chair in the organization's history. He was also in attendance for the consecration of Gene Robinson, the first openly gay person to become a bishop within the Episcopal Church. Later, he participated with Robinson in the 2004 "People Who Care About People with AIDS" event at St. John's Episcopal Church in Royal Oak, Michigan.

He had stopped functioning publicly after the onset of dementia several years prior to his death.

McGehee died on the night of March 14, 2013, after a protracted illness at St. Joseph Mercy Hospital in Pontiac, Michigan. His daughter, Cary, was reading spiritual imperatives to him at the time of his death.

See also

 List of bishops of the Episcopal Church in the United States of America

References

External links
 Web site of the Episcopal Church
 Web site of the Diocese of Michigan

Episcopal Church (United States)
1923 births
2013 deaths
Religious leaders from Richmond, Virginia
Virginia Tech alumni
University of Richmond School of Law alumni
Virginia lawyers
20th-century American lawyers
20th-century American Episcopalians
Episcopal bishops of Michigan
United States Army personnel of World War II